Each "article" in this category is a collection of entries about several stamp issuers, presented in alphabetical order. The entries are formulated on the micro model and so provide summary information about all known issuers.  

See the :Category:Compendium of postage stamp issuers page for details of the project.

La Agüera 

Lagouira aka La Gouera is a city on the Atlantic coast of Africa at the southern tip of Western Sahara, on the western side of the Ras Nouadhibou peninsula.  It was called La Agüera when it came into existence in 1920 as a short-lived Spanish colonial possession.  It was originally a Spanish air base.  The stamps were other Spanish types overprinted with "La Agüera". 

Dates 	1920–1924
Currency 	100 centimos = 1 peseta

Refer 	Spanish West Africa

Labuan 

Dates 	1879–1906
Capital 	
Currency 	100 cents = 1 dollar

Refer 	Straits Settlements

La Canea 

Refer 	Khania (Italian Post Office)

Lagos 

Dates 	1874–1906
Currency 	12 pence = 1 shilling; 20 shillings = 1 pound

Refer 	Nigerian Territories

Laibach (German Occupation) 

Dates 	1943–1945
Capital 	Ljubljana
Currency 	100 centesimi = 1 lira

Refer 	German Occupation Issues (World War II)

See also 	Lubiana (Italian Occupation)

LANSA 

Dates 	1950–1951
Currency 	100 centavos = 1 peso

Refer 	Colombian Territories

Laos 

Dates 	1951 –
Capital 	Vientiane
Currency 	(1951) 100 cents = 1 piastre
		(1955) 100 cents = 1 kip

Main Article Needed

Las Bela 

Dates 	1897 only
Capital 	Bela
Currency 	12 pies = 1 anna; 16 annas = 1 rupee

Refer 	Indian Native States

Latakia 

Dates 	1931–1937
Capital 	Latakia
Currency  	100 centimes = 1 piastre

Refer 	Alaouites

See also 	Syria

Lattaquie 

Refer 	Latakia

Latvia 

Dates 	1991 –
Capital 	Riga
Currency 	(1991) 100 kopecks = 1 Latvian rouble
		(1993) 100 santimu = 1 lats

Main Article Needed 

Includes 	Latvia (pre–Soviet)

See also 	Union of Soviet Socialist Republics (USSR)

Latvia (pre-Soviet) 

Dates 	1918–1940
Capital 	Riga
Currency 	(1918) 100 kopecks = 1 Latvian rouble
		(1923) 100 santimi (centimes) = 1 lats

Refer 	Latvia

Latvia (German Occupation) 

Dates 	1941 only
Currency 	100 kopecks = 1 Russian ruble

Refer 	German Occupation Issues (World War II)

Latvija 

Refer 	Latvia

League of Nations (Geneva) 

Dates 	1922–1944
Currency 	100 centimes = 1 franc

Refer 	International Organisations

Lebanon 

Dates 	1924 –
Capital 	Beirut
Currency 	100 centimes = 1 piastre

Main Article Needed 

Includes 	Greater Lebanon

Leeward Islands 

Dates 	1890–1956
Capital 	St John's (Antigua)
Currency  	(1890) 12 pence = 1 shilling; 20 shillings = 1 pound
		(1951) 100 cents = 1 dollar

Main Article Postage stamps and postal history of the Leeward Islands

Leipzig 

Refer 	North West Saxony (Russian Zone)

Lemnos 

Dates 	1912–1913
Capital 	Kastron
Currency  	100 lepta = 1 drachma

Refer 	Greek Occupation Issues

Lero 

Refer 	Leros

Leros 

Dates 	1912–1932
Capital 	Ayia Marina
Currency  	100 centesimi = 1 lira

Refer 	Aegean Islands (Dodecanese)

Lesbos 

Dates 	1912–1913
Capital 	Mytilene
Currency  	Greek and Turkish both used

Refer 	Greek Occupation Issues

Lesotho 

Dates 	1966 –
Capital 	Maseru
Currency 	100 cents = 1 rand

Main Article  Postage stamps and postal history of Lesotho

See also 	Basutoland

Lesser Sunda Islands 

Refer 	Japanese Naval Control Area

Levant 

Refer 	Free French Forces in the Levant

Liban 

Refer 	Lebanon

Liberia 

Dates 	1860 –
Capital 	Monrovia
Currency 	100 cents = 1 dollar

Main Article Needed

Libia 

Refer 	Libya

Libya 

Dates 	1912 –
Capital 	Tripoli
Currency  	(1912) 100 centesimi = 1 lira
		(1950) 1000 milliemes = 1 Libyan pound
		(1972) 1000 dirhams = 1 dinar

Main Article Needed

Libya (Italian Post Offices) 

Refer 	Benghazi (Italian Post Office);
		Tripoli (Italian Post Office)

Liechtenstein 

Dates 	1912 –
Capital 	Vaduz
Currency 	(1912) 100 heller = 1 krone
		(1921) 100 rappen = 1 (Swiss) franc

Main Article Needed

Lietuva 

Refer 	Lithuania

Limnos 

Refer 	Lemnos

Lipsos 

Dates 	1912–1932
Capital 	
Currency  	100 centesimi = 1 lira

Refer 	Aegean Islands (Dodecanese)

Lisso 

Refer 	Lipsos

Lithuania 

Dates 	1990 –
Capital 	Vilnius
Currency 	(1990) 100 kopecks = 1 Russian ruble
		(1992) talonas
		(1993) 100 centu = 1 Lithuanian litas

Main Article Needed 

Includes 	Lithuania (pre–Soviet)

See also 	Klaipėda;
		Union of Soviet Socialist Republics (USSR)

Lithuania (pre-Soviet) 

Dates 	1918–1940
Capital 	Vilnius
Currency 	(1918) 100 skatiku = 1 auksinas
		(1922) 100 centu = 1 litas

Refer 	Lithuania

Lithuania (German Occupation) 

Dates 	1941 only
Currency 	100 kopecks = 1 Russian ruble

Refer 	German Occupation Issues (World War II)

See also 	Ostland

Lithuanian Occupation of Memel 

Refer 	Klaipėda

Litwa Srodkowa 

Refer 	Central Lithuania (Polish Occupation)

Livonia 

Refer 	Wenden

Lombardy & Venetia 

Dates 	1850–1866
Capital 	Milan (to 1859); Venice (1859–66)
Currency 	(1850) 100 centesimi = 1 lira
		(1858) 100 soldi = 1 florin
		(1858) 100 kreutzer = 1 florin

Main Article Needed 

See also 	Austria

Long Island (British Occupation) 

Dates 	1916 only
Currency 	12 pence = 1 shilling; 20 shillings = 1 pound

Refer 	British Occupation Issues

Lorraine (German Occupation) 

Dates 	1940–1941
Currency 	100 pfennige = 1 mark

Refer 	German Occupation Issues (World War II)

Lothringen 

Refer 	Lorraine (German Occupation)

Lourenço Marques 

Dates 	1895–1921
Currency 	(1895) 1000 reis = 1 milreis
		(1912) 100 centavos = 1 escudo

Refer 	Mozambique Territories

Lübeck 

Dates 	1859–1868
Currency 	16 schillinge = 1 mark

Refer 	German States

Lubiana (Italian Occupation) 

Dates 	1941 only
Currency 	100 paras = 1 dinar

Refer 	Italian Occupation Issues

See also 	Laibach (German Occupation)

Lucca 

Refer 	Tuscany

Luxembourg 

Dates 	1852 –
Capital 	Luxembourg
Currency  	(1852) 121/2 centimes = 1 silver groschen; 100 centimes = 1 franc
		(1940) 100 pfennige = 1 reichsmark
		(1944) 100 centimes = 1 franc
		(2002) 100 cent = 1 euro

Main Article Needed

Luxembourg (German Occupation) 

Dates 	1940–1944
Currency 	100 pfennige = 1 reichsmark

Refer 	German Occupation Issues (WW2)

Lydenburg 

Dates 	1900–1902
Currency 	12 pence = 1 shilling; 20 shillings = 1 pound

Refer 	Transvaal

References

Bibliography
 Stanley Gibbons Ltd, Europe and Colonies 1970, Stanley Gibbons Ltd, 1969
 Stanley Gibbons Ltd, various catalogues
 Stuart Rossiter & John Flower, The Stamp Atlas, W H Smith, 1989
 XLCR Stamp Finder and Collector's Dictionary, Thomas Cliffe Ltd, c.1960

External links
 AskPhil – Glossary of Stamp Collecting Terms
 Encyclopaedia of Postal History

Labuan